The San Joaquin Wash is a stream in Irvine, Orange County, California and is a tributary of San Diego Creek. Its watershed includes part of the northern San Joaquin Hills, for which it is named. It flows west-northwest for about  before joining San Diego Creek near University of California, Irvine.

See also
List of rivers of Orange County, California

Orange County, California articles needing infoboxes
Rivers of Orange County, California
Unreferenced Orange County, California articles